Information-theoretic death is a term of art used in cryonics to define death in a way that is permanent and independent of any future medical advances, no matter how distant or improbable that may be. Because detailed reading or restoration of information-storing brain structures is well beyond current technology, the term lacks practical importance in medicine.

References

Cryonics
Death